Ola Fredrik Andreas Kimrin (born February 29, 1972) is a Swedish former American football placekicker who most recently played for the Miami Dolphins in the National Football League.

Background and college
Kimrin kicked for the Limhamn Griffins club team from 1995–1996.  He played soccer for the Vintrie IK club team in Sweden from ages 5–20. Kimrin received a scholarship at the University of Texas at El Paso in 1996 and played three seasons for the Miners.  He played 23 career games, primarily serving as kickoff specialist, and was five-of-eight on field goal attempts in 1997.

In 1999, he played on the Swedish national team that won bronze at the 1999 IFAF World Championship in Italy, the first ever IFAF World Championship.

Professional career
Kimrin played for NFL Europe in 2001 and 2002. In the 2002 season, he led NFL Europe kickers in scoring (57 points) for the Frankfurt Galaxy, converting 12-of-24 field goals (long of 52) and 20-of-22 extra point attempts. He then signed a free agent contract with the Denver Broncos and kicked a 65-yard field goal in the final preseason game against Seattle. Had that kick taken place during the regular season, it would have eclipsed the NFL record of 63 yards, at that time shared by Tom Dempsey and Jason Elam. The record also would have survived the later kicks by Sebastian Janikowski (63 yards), David Akers (63 yards), Graham Gano (63 yards), and Matt Prater (64 yards on 8 December 2013) to be broken by Justin Tucker (66 yards, for the record on 26 September 2021). However, being it was a field goal kicked in a pre-season game, Kimrin's 65-yarder did not count as an NFL record.

Despite the 65-yard pre-season field goal, Kimrin was released at the conclusion of camp in favor of veteran Jason Elam. He then competed for a job with the Dallas Cowboys in 2003 during training camp but lost out to one-year veteran Billy Cundiff near the end of the preseason. In 2004, he signed as a free agent with the Washington Redskins prior to training camp and was 4-of-4 on field goals during preseason, but lost the job to veteran John Hall. Kimrin was then re-signed by Washington after Hall suffered a hamstring injury and played in five regular season games, converting 6-of-10 field goals and all six extra point attempts. He was then released in November. Prior to the NFL season, Kimrin spent the 2004 NFL Europe campaign with the Cologne Centurions, converting 4-of-4 field goal attempts and all 21 extra point attempts, good for 33 points on the season. He was with the Redskins again for some of the 2005 season, then with the Tennessee Titans. Kimrin later signed with the Miami Dolphins, but was released on August 29, 2006 and retired afterward.

Post-NFL career
He is now retired and he spends time with his family but has participated as a coach for the Swedish national team and also played some exhibition games in Europe.

References

1972 births
Living people
American football placekickers
Cologne Centurions (NFL Europe) players
Dallas Cowboys players
Denver Broncos players
Frankfurt Galaxy players
Miami Dolphins players
Sportspeople from Malmö
Swedish players of American football
Tennessee Titans players
UTEP Miners football players
Washington Redskins players